is the 32nd single by Japanese singer Yōko Oginome, and it is a duet with Kazuhito Murata. Written by Yasushi Akimoto and Tsugutoshi Gotō, the single was released on February 9, 1994, by Victor Entertainment.

Background and release
The duet was planned by Victor Entertainment to celebrate Valentine's Day and White Day. The song was used by Bourbon Corporation for their "Valentine's and White Day" commercials. The single features three different karaoke mixes for individual listeners to sing Oginome or Murata's vocals, or to sing it in its entirety.

"Yumemiru Planet" peaked at No. 50 on Oricon's singles chart and sold over 10,000 copies.

Track listing
All lyrics are written by Yasushi Akimoto; all music is composed and arranged by Tsugutoshi Gotō.

Charts

References

External links

1994 singles
Yōko Oginome songs
Japanese-language songs
Songs with lyrics by Yasushi Akimoto
Victor Entertainment singles